The following is a list of football stadiums in Belgium, ranked in descending order of capacity. This list includes the football stadiums in Belgium with a capacity of at least 5,000.

Stadiums

Former football stadiums

See also
Football in Belgium
List of football clubs in Belgium
List of European stadiums by capacity
List of association football stadiums by capacity

References

 
Belgium
Football stadiums
stadium